The Umm al-Qura Mosque ("Mother of All Cities") is a mosque located in Baghdad, Iraq. It was the city's largest place of worship for Sunni Muslims, but it has also become the location of a Shia hawza and a place of refuge for many fleeing the terrorists' depredations in the Anbar Province. Originally called the Umm al-Ma'arik ("Mother of All Battles") mosque, it was designed to commemorate Saddam Hussein's self-proclaimed victory in the 1991 Gulf War and was intended to serve as a personal tribute to Saddam himself. It is located in the Sunni-populated al-Adel area of western Baghdad. Costing 7.5 million to build, the mosque's cornerstone was laid on Saddam's 61st birthday on 28 April 1998. It was formally completed on 28 April 2001 in time for the ten-year anniversary of the Gulf War.

Although never confirmed by his regime or himself during his lifetime, there has been speculation that it was intended to have been Saddam's final resting place.

Architectural features 
The mosque is built of white limestone with blue mosaic decorations. Many architectural features of the mosque and the surrounding complex allude to Saddam Hussein or to the Gulf War of 1990–91.

Western observers have described the mosque's eight minarets as resembling weapons, but the Iraqi government rejects that interpretation. The mosque has four minarets surrounding the dome, and four more at the outer corners of the complex. The inner minarets are said to resemble Kalashnikov rifle barrels, while those on the perimeter are described as looking like Scud ballistic missiles.

Other features clearly refer to Saddam and his politics. The outer minarets are reportedly each 43 meters high, commemorating the 43 days of "U.S. aggression" in January–February 1991, during the Gulf War. The other four minarets are 37 meters in height, commemorating Saddam's birth in 1937. At the center of the mosque is a pool "shaped like the Arab world." The pool has 28 fountains, which together with the four 37-meter minarets represent Saddam's birth date, 28 April 1937. A Qur'an written in ink made of Saddam's blood was formerly displayed within the mosque complex. Red, white and black Iraqi flags are painted on the peaks of the inner minarets.

Following the fall of Saddam Hussein in the aftermath of the 2003 US invasion of Iraq, the mosque was taken over by a Sunni group called the Association of Muslim Scholars. It became a recruiting site and propaganda centre for the early Iraqi insurgency. The association became a de facto Al Qaeda ally; its leader Harith Suleiman al-Dhari, who operated out of the mosque, is said to have played a key role in mobilizing insurgents during the 2004 fighting in Fallujah, west of Baghdad. In 2007, the association was expelled by the Sunni Endowment, a quasi-governmental agency responsible for Sunni mosques in Iraq, which took control of Umm al-Qura.

On 28 August 2011, the mosque was attacked by a suicide bomber during prayers, killing at least 28 people and injuring 30 more. An Iraqi member of parliament was among the dead.

See also 

 Islam in Iraq
 List of mosques in Iraq

References

Architecture in Iraq
2001 establishments in Iraq
Mosques completed in 2001
Mosques in Baghdad
Sunni mosques in Iraq